Elliott Glacier is a small channel glacier that drains northward to the Budd Coast of Antarctica, midway between Cape Hammersly and Cape Waldron. It was delineated from aerial photographs taken by U.S. Navy Operation Highjump (1946–47), and named by the Advisory Committee on Antarctic Names after Samuel Elliott, a midshipman on the sloop Vincennes during the United States Exploring Expedition (1838–42) under Lieutenant Charles Wilkes.

See also
 List of glaciers in the Antarctic
 Glaciology

References 

 

Glaciers of Wilkes Land